Mutua may refer to:

 Mutua Madrid Open, a tennis tournament played on indoor hard courts since 2002, sponsored by Mutua Madrileña
 Mutua Madrileña, non-profit Spanish insurance company founded in 1930
 Mutua (surname)